Suffrage in Australia refers to the right to vote (usually referred to as franchise) for people living in Australia, including all its six component states (before 1901 called colonies) and territories, as well as local councils. The colonies of Australia began to grant universal male suffrage from 1856, with women's suffrage following between the 1890s and 1900s. Some jurisdictions introduced racial restrictions on voting from 1885. Such restrictions had been eradicated by the 1960s. Today, the right to vote at federal, state and local levels of government is enjoyed by citizens of Australia over the age of 18 years.

History

Upon British settlement in New South Wales in 1788, the appointed Governors had autocratic powers within the colony, but agitation for representative government began soon after the settlement. A legislative body, the New South Wales Legislative Council, was created in 1825, which was an appointed body whose function was to advise the Governor. On 24 August 1824, 5 members were appointed to the Council, which increased to 7 members in 1825, and between 10 and 15 in 1829. Also in 1829, British sovereignty was extended to cover the whole of Australia, and everyone born in Australia, including Aborigines and Torres Strait Islanders, became British subjects by birth.

The first parliamentary elections in Australia took place in 1843 for the New South Wales Legislative Council under the New South Wales Constitution Act 1842 (UK). The Council had 36 members, of which 12 were appointed by the Governor and the remainder were elected. The right to vote was limited to men with a freehold valued at £200 or a householder paying rent of £20 per year, both very large sums at the time.

Responsible self-government was granted to Tasmania (1 May 1855), South Australia (24 June 1856) New South Wales and Victoria (16 July 1855),  Queensland (6 June 1859) and Western Australia in 1890 . Eligibility to vote was restricted and varied between the colonies based on age, gender, and property ownership. Most of the colonies included indigenous men in the right to vote but they were not encouraged to enroll. Queensland and Western Australia denied indigenous people the vote.

An innovative secret ballot was introduced in Tasmania on 4 February 1856, Victoria (13 March 1856), South Australia (12 February 1856), New South Wales (1858),  Queensland (1859) and Western Australia (1877). A form of postal voting was introduced in Western Australia in 1877, followed by an improved method in South Australia in 1890.

In 1856, under a new Constitution, the New South Wales Parliament became bicameral with a fully elected Legislative Assembly and a fully appointed Legislative Council with a Government taking over most of the legislative powers of the Governor. On 22 May 1856, the newly constituted New South Wales Parliament opened and sat for the first time. The right to vote for Legislative Assembly was extended to all adult males in 1858.

All women in South Australia were granted the right to vote in South Australian elections in 1894, followed by women in Western Australia in 1899 .

In 1901, the six Australian colonies united to form the federal Commonwealth of Australia. The first election for the Commonwealth Parliament in 1901 was based on the electoral laws at that time of the six colonies, so that those who had the right to vote and to stand for Parliament at state level had the same rights for the 1901 Australian federal election. Only in South Australia (since 1895) and Western Australia (since 1899) did women have a vote. Tasmania retained a small property qualification for voting, but in the other states all male British subjects over 21 could vote. Only in South Australia (which included the Northern Territory) and Tasmania were indigenous Australians entitled to vote. In some areas of South Australia the Aboriginal vote may have influenced the poll outcome. Western Australia and Queensland specifically barred indigenous people from voting.

In 1902, the Commonwealth Parliament passed the Commonwealth Franchise Act 1902, which established a uniform franchise law for the federal Parliament. The Act declared that all British subjects over the age of 21 years who had been living in Australia for at least 6 months were entitled to a vote, whether male or female, and whether married or single. Besides granting Australian women the right to vote at a national level, it also allowed them to stand for election to federal Parliament. This meant that Australia was the second country, after New Zealand, to grant women's suffrage at a national level, and the first country to allow women to stand for Parliament. However, the Act also disqualified Indigenous people from Australia, Asia, Africa and the Pacific Islands, with the exception of Māori, from voting, even though they were British subjects and otherwise entitled to a vote. By this provision, Indian people, for example, were disqualified to vote. The only exception was in relation to those who were entitled under Section 41 of the Australian Constitution to a vote. Section 41 states that any individual who has gained a right to vote at a state level, must also have the right to vote in federal elections. The then Solicitor-General, Robert Garran, interpreted the provision to mean that Commonwealth voting rights were granted by section 41 only to people who were already State voters in 1902. The effect was not to enable those who subsequently acquired the right to vote at a State level, but who were expressly excluded from the franchise by the 1902 Act, such as Indigenous Australians, to also vote at the federal level. Also, those otherwise entitled voters who are subject to a crime which carries a penalty of over one year in prison are disqualified to vote. There was also no representation for any of the territories of Australia.

In the meantime, State franchise laws continued in force until each one chose to amend them.

In 1897, in South Australia, Catherine Helen Spence was the first woman to stand as a political candidate. The restrictions on voting by indigenous Australians were relaxed after World War II, and removed by the  Commonwealth Electoral Act in 1962. Senator Neville Bonner became the first Aboriginal Australian to sit in the federal Parliament in 1971. Julia Gillard became the first female Prime Minister of Australia in 2010.

Male suffrage

The first European-style governments established after 1788 were autocratic and run by appointed governors - although English law was transplanted into the Australian colonies by virtue of the doctrine of reception, thus notions of the rights and processes established by the Magna Carta and the Bill of Rights 1689 were brought from Britain by the colonists. Agitation for representative government began soon after the settlement of the colonies.

Adelaide City Council was established in 1840 and the City of Sydney in 1842. The right to stand for election was limited to men who possessed £1000 worth of property and wealthy landowners were permitted up to four votes each in elections.

In 1835, William Wentworth had established the Australian Patriotic Association which agitated for representative government for New South Wales and a broad franchise, a goal at least partially achieved in 1842. Despite opposition from conservative free settlers in the colony, who sought representative government but emancipists being disenfranchised, the colony's constitution of 1842 gave to emancipists the same political rights as free settlers, but which was subject to a property test. The right to vote was limited to men with a freehold valued at £200 or a householder paying rent of £20 per year, both very large sums at the time. Australia's first parliamentary elections were conducted for the New South Wales Legislative Council in 1843. Voter rights were extended in New South Wales in 1850 and elections for legislative councils were held in the colonies of Victoria, South Australia and Tasmania.

By the mid 19th century, there was a strong desire for representative and responsible government in the Australian colonies, fed by the democratic spirit of the goldfields evident at the Eureka Rebellion and the ideas of the great reform movements sweeping Europe, the United States and the British Empire, such as Chartism. The end of convict transportation accelerated reform in the 1840s and 1850s. The Australian Colonies Government Act [1850] was a landmark development which granted representative constitutions to New South Wales, Victoria, South Australia and Tasmania and the colonies enthusiastically set about writing constitutions which produced democratically progressive parliaments - though the constitutions generally maintained the role of the colonial upper houses as representative of social and economic "interests" and all established Constitutional Monarchies with the British monarch as the symbolic head of state. In 1856 South Australia granted the right to vote to all male British subjects (a term which extended to Indigenous males) 21 years or over however eligibility to vote for the upper House continued to have property restrictions. This right was extended to Victoria in 1857 and New South Wales the following year. The other colonies followed until, in 1900, Tasmania became the last colony to grant universal male suffrage, though some colonies explicitly excluded Indigenous males from the vote.

Female suffrage

The female descendants of the Bounty mutineers who lived on Pitcairn Islands could vote from 1838, and this right transferred with their resettlement to Norfolk Island (now an Australian external territory) in 1856.

Propertied women in the colony of South Australia were granted the vote in local municipal elections (but not parliamentary elections) in 1861. 
Henrietta Dugdale formed the first Australian women's suffrage society in Melbourne, Victoria in 1884. Women in the other colonies soon followed forming their own societies. The international Women's Christian Temperance Union set up Womanhood Suffrage departments in each colony. The suffrage groups collected monster suffrage petitions to submit to the colonial parliaments, with varying success. For Queensland's three petitions, one for women and a second for men were collected in 1894, and a third arranged by the WCTU in 1897. Women in South Australia and the Northern Territory became eligible to vote for the Parliament of South Australia following passage of the Women's Suffrage Bill in December 1894 and receiving Royal assent in 1895. In 1897, Catherine Helen Spence became the first female political candidate for political office, unsuccessfully standing for election as a delegate to Federal Convention on Australian Federation. Western Australia granted voting rights to women in 1899.

The first election for the Parliament of the newly formed Commonwealth of Australia in 1901 was based on the electoral provisions of the six pre-existing colonies, so that women who had the vote and the right to stand for Parliament at state level, namely South Australia and Western Australia, had the same voting rights for the 1901 Australian federal election. The Commonwealth Franchise Act 1902 set uniform rules across Australia, and gave all women the right to vote and stand for election for federal Parliament. Four women stood at the 1903 federal election, all of whom stood as independents and all of whom were unsuccessful. The Act did, however, specifically exclude 'natives' from Commonwealth franchise unless already enrolled in a state at the time. The other states followed suit granting women over 21 the vote soon after: New South Wales in 1902, Tasmania in 1903, Queensland in 1905 and Victoria in 1908, the last state to do so.

The year in which women obtained the right to vote in Australia are summarised as follows:

Indigenous Australians

Traditional Aboriginal society had been governed by councils of elders and a corporate decision making process.  Indigenous Australians began to be enfranchised within Parliamentary systems of the Australian colonies during the 1850s. However, the granting of voting rights was uneven and restricted altogether in some colonies (and later states). Vestigial legal discrimination against Indigenous voters was removed in the 1960s.

When the colonial constitutions of New South Wales, Victoria, South Australia and Tasmania were framed in the 1850s, voting rights were granted to all male British subjects over the age of 21, which included Aboriginal men. A few may have done so in South Australia. Western Australia and Queensland specifically barred indigenous people from voting. However, few Aborigines were aware of their rights and hence very few participated in elections. The situation became murkier when the Commonwealth Franchise Act was passed in 1902. The Act gave women a vote in federal elections but Aboriginal people and people from Asia, Africa or the Pacific Islands (except for Māori) were excluded unless entitled under Section 41 of the Australian Constitution. Section 41 states that any individual who has gained a right to vote at a state level, must also have the right to vote in federal elections. The Solicitor-General, Sir Robert Garran, interpreted it to mean that Commonwealth rights were granted only to people who were already State voters in 1902. What transpired was a situation where Aboriginals who had already enrolled to vote were able to continue to do so, whereas those who had not were denied the right. This interpretation was challenged in Victoria in 1924 by an Indian migrant, where the magistrate ruled that Section 2 meant that people who acquired State votes at any date were entitled to a Commonwealth vote. The Commonwealth government in 1925 changed the law to give natives of British India living in Australia the vote (there were only about 100 in Australia at the time), but continued to deny other non-white applicants.

Campaigns for indigenous civil rights in Australia gathered momentum from the 1930s. In 1938, with the participation of leading indigenous activists like Douglas Nicholls, the Australian Aborigines' League organised the "Day of Mourning", which marked in protest the 150th anniversary of the arrival of the First Fleet to the Australian continent and launched its campaign for full civil rights for all Aboriginal Autralians. In the 1940s, the conditions of life for Aboriginals could be very poor. A permit system restricted movement and work opportunities for many Aboriginal people. In the 1950s, the government pursued a policy of "assimilation" which sought to achieve full civil rights for Aboriginal but also wanted them to adopt the mode of life of other Australians (which very often was assumed to require suppression of cultural identity).

In 1949, the right to vote in federal elections was extended to all Indigenous people who had served in the armed forces, or were enrolled to vote in state elections (Queensland and Western Australia still excluded indigenous people from the vote). Remaining federal restrictions were abolished in 1962, though enrolment was voluntary.

In the 1960s, reflecting the strong civil rights movements in the United States and South Africa, many changes in Aboriginals’ rights and treatment followed, including removal of restrictions on voting rights. The Menzies Government Commonwealth Electoral Act of 1962 confirmed the Commonwealth vote for all Aboriginals. Western Australia gave them State votes in the same year, and Queensland followed in 1965.

The 1967 referendum was held and electors overwhelmingly approved the amendment of the Constitution to remove discriminatory references and giving the national parliament the power to legislate specifically for Indigenous Australians. Contrary to frequently repeated mythology, this referendum did not cover citizenship for Indigenous people, nor did it give them the vote: they already had both. However, transferring this power away from the State parliaments did bring an end to the system of Indigenous Australian reserves which existed in each state, which allowed Indigenous people to move more freely, and exercise many of their citizenship rights for the first time. From the late 1960s a movement for Indigenous land rights also developed. In the mid 1960s, one of the earliest Aboriginal graduates from the University of Sydney, Charles Perkins, helped organise freedom rides into parts of Australia to expose discrimination and inequality. In 1966, the Gurindji people of Wave Hill station (owned by the Vestey Group) commenced strike action led by Vincent Lingiari in a quest for equal pay and recognition of land rights.

Indigenous Australians began to take up representation in Australian parliaments during the 1970s. In 1971 Neville Bonner of the Liberal Party was appointed by the Queensland Parliament to replace a retiring senator, becoming the first Aborigine in Federal Parliament. Bonner was returned as a Senator at the 1972 election and remained until 1983. Hyacinth Tungutalum of the Country Liberal Party in the Northern Territory and Eric Deeral of the National Party of Queensland, became the first Indigenous people elected to territory and state legislatures in 1974. In 1976, Sir Douglas Nicholls was appointed Governor of South Australia, becoming the first Aborigine to hold vice-regal office in Australia. Aden Ridgeway of the Australian Democrats served as a senator during the 1990s, but no indigenous person was elected to the House of Representatives, until West Australian Liberal Ken Wyatt, in August 2010.

Territory representation
Until 1911, the Northern Territory was a part of South Australia. The status of South Australian voters, which enfranchised both women and Indigenous Australians there to a vote, also qualified them to vote in elections for both Houses of the Commonwealth Parliament at the first federal elections in 1901. In 1911, however, the Northern Territory was transferred to the Commonwealth government, which also had the effect of depriving Territorians of all political representation. At the time of the Commonwealth takeover the Territory's population was 3,031.

Before 1936, the Member for Northern Territory could speak in the House and take part in committee work, but could not vote, and did not count for the purpose of forming government. Between 1936 and 1959 the Member was only able to vote in motions to disallow laws made for the Territory, and between 1959 and 1968, the Member could only vote on matters relating to the Territory alone. In 1968, the Member for Northern Territory acquired full voting rights.

After the 1974 federal election, the Whitlam Labor Government legislation to give the Australian Capital Territory and the Northern Territory representation in the Australian Senate, with two senators being elected from each, was passed by the subsequent Joint Sitting of parliament.

Voting age
Initially, voting in colonial elections was based on a property requirement. The Australian Constitution ensured that the right to vote for the Senate was granted to the same people as could vote for the House of Representatives. Some state upper houses were either appointed or kept a restricted franchise well into the last half of the 20th century. The South Australian Legislative Council was elected on a property-based franchise until 1973. The New South Wales Legislative Council was appointed until 1978. Since the 1970s, all the houses of Australian parliaments have been elected on a full adult franchise basis.

The property requirement was replaced for the lower houses of colonial Parliaments with a voting age of 21 years for men only, as follows: South Australia (1856), Victoria (1857), New South Wales (1858), Queensland (1872),  Western Australia (1893), Tasmania (1896). Women of 21 years acquired the vote subsequently (see above). State voting age laws applied at the first federal election, and was legislated for federal elections in 1902, applying equally to men and women 21 years of age.

The exception was military service. In World War I, members of the armed services had the vote in some states, and in World War II, the Commonwealth and some states did the same. After Premier Don Dunstan introduced the Age of Majority (Reduction) Bill in October 1970, the voting age in South Australia was lowered to 18 years old in 1973.

The voting age for all federal elections was lowered from 21 to 18 in 1973. The states had lowered the voting age to 18 by 1973, the first being Western Australian in 1970.

Disenfranchisement of prisoners
At Federation, the Commonwealth Franchise Act 1902 disenfranchised those "attainted of treason, or who had been convicted and is under sentence or subject to be sentenced for any offence … punishable by imprisonment for one year or longer."

In 1983, this disenfranchisement was relaxed and prisoners serving a sentence for a crime punishable under the law for less than 5 years were allowed to vote. A further softening occurred in 1995 when the disenfranchisement was limited to those actually serving a sentence of 5 years or longer, although earlier that year the Keating Government had been planning legislation to extend voting rights to all prisoners. Disenfranchisement does not continue after release from jail/prison.

The Howard Government legislated in 2006 to ban all prisoners from voting; but in 2007, the High Court in Roach v Electoral Commissioner found that the Constitution enshrined a limited right to vote, which meant that citizens serving relatively short prison sentences (generally less than 3 years) cannot be barred from voting. The threshold of 3 years or more sentence will result in removal of the prisoner from the federal electoral roll, and the person must re-enrol upon release.

Each state has its own prisoner disenfranchisement thresholds. For example, prisoners in NSW and Western Australia serving a sentence of longer than one year are not entitled to vote in State elections. In Victoria, persons are struck off the electoral roll if serving a prison sentence of 5 years or more. In Queensland elections, people serving prison sentences of 3 years or longer are not entitled to vote. There is no prisoner disenfranchisement in the Australian Capital Territory or South Australia.

Voting by foreigners

All British subjects who were enrolled to vote in Australia before 26 January 1984 retain voting rights at federal and state elections in Australia. As of that date, the right of other British subjects to enrol to vote was abolished. A right to vote has been grandfathered: a British national who was enrolled to vote before 26 January 1984 can re-enrol at any time, even if his/her enrolment has lapsed subsequently for any reason. British nationals on the electoral roll, like all other people enrolled to vote in Australia, are subject to compulsory voting, and are required by law to attend a polling place on election days.

In most cases, local government electoral rolls in Australia are open to all adults, including non-citizens, who meet other criteria – such as residency requirements.

Before 26 January 1949, people born in Australia were known under Australian law as "British subjects", and there was no legal distinction between them and other British subjects.  From 1949, anyone born in Australia was officially termed an Australian citizen, although British subjects retained voting rights in Australia.

See also
History of Australia
Human rights in Australia
List of suffragists and suffragettes
Timeline of women's suffrage

References

Further reading
 Brankovich, Jasmina. "Votes for All Women? Racialised Silences in Western Australian Suffrage Historiography." Studies in Western Australian History, no. 19 (1999): 20-28.
Grimshaw, Patricia. "Settler Anxieties, Indigenous Peoples, and Women's Suffrage in the Colonies of Australia, New Zealand, and Hawai'i, 1888 to 1902." Pacific Historical Review 69, no. 4 (2000): 553-72.
Magarey, Susan. Passions of the First Wave Feminists.  Melbourne: Cambridge University Press, 2001.
Nolan, Melanie, and Caroline Daley, eds. Suffrage and Beyond: International Feminist Perspectives. Auckland: Auckland University Press, 1994.
Keating, James. "'An Utter Absence of National Feeling': Australian Women and the International Suffrage Movement, 1900–14." Australian Historical Studies 47, no. 3 (2016): 462-81.
Oldfield, Audrey. Woman Suffrage in Australia: A Gift or a Struggle?  Melbourne: Cambridge University Press, 1992.

Stevenson, Ana. "Imagining Women’s Suffrage: Frontier Landscapes and the Transnational Print Culture of Australia, New Zealand and the United States." Pacific Historical Review 87, no. 4 (2018): 638-66.
Wright, Clare. You Daughters of Freedom: The Australians Who Won the Vote and Inspired the World.  Melbourne: Text Publishing, 2018.

Political history of Australia
Australia